In a Time Lapse is a studio album by Italian composer Ludovico Einaudi released on .  Two days before the release, on 19 January, Einaudi played live from his home in Milan solo arrangements of some of the music from In a Time Lapse through his official YouTube channel.

Track listing

Critical reception

In a Time Lapse has received overwhelmingly positive reviews from music critics. According to a Classic FM review, "The Italian composer strikes gold once more with a haunting combination of dreamlike piano tunes and busy orchestral soundscapes." The CD Critic put forth that In a Time Lapse is "gorgeously ambient." The Independent critic noted the "trancelike wave motion of tracks like 'Corale' and 'Run'" and "the more complex, layered pieces such as 'Life' ... cycling piano and glockenspiel against rhapsodic, flowing string lines", while also saying, concerning Einaudi's talent, that "there's a deeply satisfying emotional logic to his piano-based progressions that makes him as much the inheritor" of Frédéric Chopin and Erik Satie as of minimalists such as Philip Glass and Steve Reich.

Charts

Weekly charts

Year-end charts

Certifications

References

External links 
 Official site

Ludovico Einaudi albums
2013 albums
Instrumental albums